This is a list of years in Belize. For only articles about years in Belize that have been written, see :Category:Years in Belize.

Twenty-first century

Twentieth century

Nineteenth century

Eighteenth century

See also 
 List of years by country

 
Belize-related lists
Belize